In Extremo (Latin for At the Edge; abbreviated InEx or IE) is a German Medieval metal band originating from Berlin. The band's musical style combines metal with Medieval traditional songs, blending the sound of the standard rock/metal instruments with historical instruments (such as bagpipes, harp, hurdy-gurdy and shawm). Versions of well-known traditional/Medieval ballads make up the main part of their repertoire, but the band has written an increasing share of original material in recent years. Their own material is written in German, whilst the traditional songs and cover songs are in a variety of languages.

History

In Extremo began as two projects: a nameless, purely Medieval band, and a rock band. They became known at that time through frequent appearances at Medieval market meetings, at which they performed their acoustic pieces and sold CDs of their renditions of traditional songs. On 11 April 1995, during the recording for that year's season, Michael Rhein (alias "Das letzte Einhorn", "The Last Unicorn") found the project name "In Extremo".

Most of the band members perform under stage names. The initial members of the Medieval band were Das letzte Einhorn (vocals), "Flex der Biegsame" ("Flex the Flexible"; bagpipes), "Dr. Pymonte" (bagpipes), Conny Fuchs (who left the band before the official release date, due to her pregnancy, and was replaced by Dr. Pymonte) and Sen Pusterbalg (replaced shortly after the official release by "Yellow Pfeiffer", "Yellow Piper"; bagpipes). The band originally consisted of "Thomas der Münzer" ("Thomas the Coiner"; guitar), "Der Morgenstern" ("The Morning Star"; drums) and "Die Lutter" ("The Lutter", bass guitar). Der Münzer subsequently left the band and, the band's guitarist is "Van Lange". As noted below, almost all of the band members play multiple instruments.

The increasing number of visitors, success of their CDs and the popular interest, as well as cross-pollination from groups such as Corvus Corax and Bathory, encouraged In Extremo in 1995 to attempt to start a band combining bagpipes and other traditional instruments with rock guitars. The result was the current incarnation of In Extremo, a rock group that integrates modern instruments like the drum set, electric bass and guitar with the acoustic elements previously used for the Medieval songs, and which plays both types of music as well as a hybrid of the two.

In August 1996, they began work on the first In Extremo album, which already contained two tracks of the new rock project. Because the album had no official name, it became known as Gold because of the golden cover. In February 1997, like the single "Der Galgen" ("The Gallows"), it quickly sold out in Medieval markets.

In Extremo played separately as a Medieval band and a rock band, until on 29 March 1997, when they played their first live rock concert. Since that time, they have given this date as their date of establishment. The two projects were officially merged on 11 January 1998. April 1998 saw the first "high occupancy" In Extremo concert in the Rabenstein castle in Brandenburg.

Over the years, the band's music became more heavy metal-based, while at the same time becoming increasingly commercially successful. The classical instruments, however – bagpipes, shawms and lutes – still play a large role. The band is likewise noted for their conspicuous stage costumes and known for using pyrotechnics in their concerts, including Der Morgenstern playing cymbals which have been set on fire.

In February 2010, In Extremo announced that Der Morgenstern left the band because of musical differences. In June, Florian "Specki T.D." Speckardt was announced as his replacement on drums. Since then, they have proceeded to release three albums: Sterneneisen, Kunstraub and Quid Pro Quo, all of which have reached the top 10 in the German charts, with Sterneneisen and Quid Pro Quo both having number 1 positions for a time. Their 13th album, Kompass zur Sonne, was scheduled to be released in May 2020, but was delayed to 2021 due to the COVID-19 pandemic.

In July 2020, the band played an online livestream concert for Wacken World Wide.

Appearances

The band's first major appearance was in the first part of the 2001 video game Gothic. A group of travelling musicians called 'In-Extremo' plays their version of the song "Herr Mannelig", from the album Verehrt und angespien, by the gallows outside the Old Camp Castle in the second chapter of the game.

With their success, the music programs also began to pay attention to In Extremo. They were invited on the television program Viva Interactive, where they gave a 15-minute call-and-response and played two songs. They rejected at that time an invitation to Top of the Pops to play "Küss mich" ("Kiss Me"), because it was, according to Das letzte Einhorn, not their environment. Nevertheless, they did accept a further invitation to Top of the Pops in 2005 and played "Nur ihr allein" ("Only You Alone").

At the same time, thei band's audience grew with live appearances, from marketplaces to festivals like Rock am Ring, the Taubertal Festival, and the Nova Rock in Austria. Their largest public appearance, however, had In Extremo opening for the farewell tour of Böhse Onkelz in June 2005, with about 120,000 spectators.

In Extremo last participated on 9 February 2006, in the Bundesvision Song Contest of Stefan Raab for the Free State of Thuringia; Das letzte Einhorn was born in Dingelstädt and grew up in Leinefelde. Both cities lie in North Thuringia. The group occupied the third spot with "Liam (German)". Beforehand, they had introduced themselves on 2 February on the television show TV total.

In Extremo also played in 2006 at the Wacken Open Air, as well as on the M'era Luna Festival in Hildesheim. At the end of the year, they played in the framework their "10 Year Anniversary Tour" in Germany, Austria and Switzerland.

Success
The first In Extremo album that attracted attention was Verehrt und angespien ("Worshipped and Spat At"). It achieved an at-the-time sensational 11th place in the German album charts. The subsequent album, Sünder ohne Zügel ("Unbridled Sinners"), reached 10th place.

The band had further success with the album 7; it came in third place on the German charts. The video of the single "Küss mich" was frequently shown on German music television. The singles reached high chart placements.

The eighth album Mein rasend Herz ("My Racing Heart") achieved third place on the album charts in 2005. Three singles were published from this album: "Nur ihr allein" ("Only You Alone") on 17 May 2005, "Horizont" ("Horizon") on 12 September 2005, and "Liam (German)" on 3 February 2006. On 10 February 2006, the second live CD/DVD, Raue Spree, was published, coming in at fourth place of the German charts. In addition, the 7 and Raue Spree achieved gold status in early 2007.

The ninth album Sängerkrieg ("Singers' War") went to first place on the album charts of Germany on 23 May 2008. In Austria, it reached the thirteenth and in Switzerland the twenty-second place. In Germany it was the 41st-best-selling album of the year in 2008.

Instruments
Besides the electric guitar, bass and drum set, In Extremo defines itself by unconventional (for a rock band) instruments mainly of Medieval origin. They include hurdy-gurdy, bagpipes, Uilleann Pipes, shawm, nyckelharpa, harp, cittern, tromba marina, hammered dulcimer, Klangbaum and various types of drums and percussion. Bagpipes are the most conspicuous of these instruments, as Dr. Pymonte, Yellow Pfeiffer (until 2021), and Flex der Biegsame all play bagpipes, sometimes all three at once. All of the band members play multiple instruments, and frequently rotate instruments between songs; Das letzte Einhorn frequently plays a cittern during certain songs, such as "Ai vis lo lop".

Their bagpipes were partially made by Dr. Pymonte, but are also partially built by a well-known pipe builder. The band also uses a custom-built frame drum covered in zebra skin, called "Das Pferd" ("The Horse"). Most of the other acoustic instruments, such as their shawms, are only made by a few other instrument builders.

Style and lyrics

Some lyrics are not written by the band, but some – like the instruments – from traditional songs written during the Middle Ages and Renaissance.

Many of the lyrics to the band's repertoire of Medieval songs come from church writings (e.g. "Wessebronner Gebet"), Benedictine writings (e.g. "Raue See") or are "trad. arr.", meaning traditional songs with unknown authors, rearranged by the band (e.g. "Merseburger Zaubersprüche", "Tannhuser", "Poc Vecem"). The band also frequently uses songs from the Carmina Burana, a Medieval collection of songs, as well as lyrics written as poetry by the 15th-century French poet François Villon ("Rotes Haar" and "Erdbeermund"; translated into German by Paul Zech).

The band also uses poems from later writers such as Johann Wolfgang von Goethe ("Der Rattenfänger" - "The Rat Catcher") and Ludwig Uhland, who wrote "Des Sängers Fluch" ("The Singer's Curse") – which In Extremo changed to be called "Spielmannsfluch" ("The Minstrel's Curse"). For the album Mein rasend Herz, In Extremo originally wrote the lyrics to the song "Liam" in German, after which it was translated into Irish by Rea Garvey, who was also a guest singer on the song.

Band members
Current members
 Michael Robert Rhein (Das letzte Einhorn/The Last Unicorn) – vocals, cittern, harp, darbuka, davul, binioù, guitar, piccolo, harmonica (1995–present)
 Marco Ernst-Felix Zorzytzky (Flex der Biegsame/Flex the Flexible) – German bagpipes, shawm, flute, uilleann pipes, hurdy-gurdy (1995–present)
 Kay Lutter (Die Lutter) – bass, marine trumpet, timpani (1995–present)
 André Strugala (Dr. Pymonte) – German bagpipes, shawm, flute, harp, marine trumpet, tsymbaly, sampler, FX (1996–present)
 Sebastian Oliver Lange (Van Lange) – guitar, cittern (1999–present)
 Florian Speckardt (Specki T.D.) – drums, percussion (2010–present)

Former members
 Conny Fuchs (Die Rote Füchsin/The Red Fox) – German bagpipes (1995–1996)
 Mathias Aring (Sen Pusterbalg) – German bagpipes (1995–1997)
 Thomas Mund (Thomas der Münzer/Thomas the Coiner) – guitar (1995–1999)
 Reiner Morgenroth (Der Morgenstern/The Morning Star) – drums, percussion, timpani, frame drum (1995–2010)
 Boris Pfeiffer (Yellow Pfeiffer/Yellow Piper) – German bagpipes, shawm, flute, nyckelharpa (1997–2021); died 2022

Timeline

Discography

Albums

Singles
 1996: Ai vis lo lop ("I Saw the Wolf") (cassette)
 1997: In Extremo (Der Galgen)
 1998: Ai vis lo lop Vocal-Remix
 1999: This Corrosion (promo maxi CD)
 1999: Merseburger Zaubersprüche ("Merseburg Incantations") (promo maxi CD)
 2000: Vollmond ("Full Moon")
 2001: Unter dem Meer ("Below the Sea") (promo maxi CD)
 2001: Wind (promo maxi CD)
 2003: Küss mich ("Kiss Me")
 2003: Erdbeermund ("Strawberry Mouth")
 2005: Nur ihr allein ("Only You Alone") – released in three versions
 2005: Horizont ("Horizon")
 2006: Liam (German version)
 2008: Frei zu sein ("To Be Free")
 2008: Neues Glück ("New Luck")
 2011: Zigeunerskat ("Gypsy Skat")
 2011: Siehst du das Licht ("Do You See the Light")
 2011: Viva la vida ("Live Life")
 2013: Feuertaufe ("Baptism by Fire")
 2015: Loreley (20th Anniversary Song)
 2016: Sternhagelvoll ("Blotto")
 2020: Troja ("Troy")
 2020: Wintermärchen ("Winter Fable")
 2020: Schenk nochmal ein

Music videos
 This Corrosion (1999, directed by Stephan Vollmer)
 Vollmond (2000, directed by Heiner Thimm)
 Wind (2001, directed by Heiner Thimm)
 Küss mich (2003, directed by Uwe Flade)
 Erdbeermund (2003, directed by Uwe Flade)
 Nur ihr allein (2005, directed by Jörn Heitmann)
 Horizont (2005 or 2006, directed by David Incorvaia)
 Liam, official live music video (2006, directed by Uwe Flade)
 Frei zu sein (2008, directed by Sharon Berkal)
 Zigeunerskat (2011)
 Viva la vida (2011)
 Siehst du das Licht (2011)
 Feuertaufe (2013)
 Loreley (20th Anniversary Song) (2015)
 Sternhagelvoll (2016)
 Störtebeker (2016)
 Lieb Vaterland, magst ruhig sein (2016)
 Troja (2020)
 Kompass zur Sonne (2020)
 Schenk nochmal ein (2020)

Video games
 Gothic (2001, Windows): The band, recreated in the game, were shown to play the acoustic version of "Herr Mannelig" ingame during the second chapter. In the international English release, the scene was removed for licensing issues, even in the digital releases. A mod can restore the cameo.

Appearances
 "I Walk Alone" (Tarja), In Extremo Remix

See also 
Corvus Corax

References

External links 

Official website (in German)
 
 

Musical groups established in 1995
Medieval metal musical groups
Metal Blade Records artists
Musical groups from Berlin
German folk metal musical groups
Participants in the Bundesvision Song Contest